Visakhapatnam district (formerly known as Vizagapatam district) is one of the six districts in the Uttarandhra  region of the Indian state of Andhra Pradesh, headquartered at Visakhapatnam.

History 
During the British rule in India, Visakhapatnam emerged as a district in the year 1802. Chicacole (present-day Srikakulam) which was in Visakhapatnam district was incorporated into Ganjam when the latter was formed as a district. On 1 April 1936, Bihar and Orissa Province was split to form Bihar Province and Orissa Province. Parts of the Vizagapatam district (i.e., Nabarangpur, Malkangiri, Koraput, Jeypore, Rayagada etc.) and the Ganjam district (excluding Chicacole division) of Madras Presidency were transferred to Orissa Province along with portions of the Vizagapatam Hill Tracts Agency and Ganjam Hill Tracts Agency. The Chicacole division (i.e., Ichchapuram, Palasa, Tekkali, Pathapatnam and Srikakulam) was merged with Visakhapatnam district.

Later, in 1950, Srikakulam district was carved out from the erstwhile Visakhapatnam district. In 1979, part of the district was split to form Vizianagaram district. Visakhapatnam district is currently a part of the Red corridor.

On 3 April 2022, Government of Andhra Pradesh has created 13 new districts in the state, hence the district was once again divided into three i.e., Visakhapatnam, Anakapalli and Alluri Sitharama Raju districts.

Administrative divisions 

The district has two revenue divisions, namely Bheemunipatnam and Visakhapatnam, each headed by a sub collector. These revenue divisions are divided into 11 mandals. The district consists of one municipal corporation. Visakhapatnam city is the only municipal corporation.

Mandals 

There are 6 mandals in Visakhapatnam division and 5 in Bheemunipatnam division. The 11 mandals under their revenue divisions are listed below:

Politics 

There are two parliamentary and six assembly constituencies in Visakhapatnam district. The parliamentary constituencies are 
The assembly constituencies are

Demographics 
According to the 2011 census Visakhapatnam district has a population of 4,290,589. This gives it a ranking of 44 in India (out of a total of 640 districts) and 4th in the state. Its population growth rate over the decade 2001–2011 was 11.89%. It has a sex ratio of 1003 females for every 1000 males, and a literacy rate of 67.7%.

After reorganization, Visakhapatnam district had a population of 1,959,544, of which 1,757,542 (89.69%) live in urban areas. The district has a sex ratio of 983 females per 1000 males. Scheduled Castes and Scheduled Tribes made up 167,272 (8.54%) and 22,574 (1.15%) of the population respectively.

At the time of the 2011 census, 92.93% of the population spoke Telugu, 2.47% Urdu, and 1.96% Hindi as their first language.

Notable people 

 Alluri Sitarama Raju, freedom fighter
 Tenneti Viswanadham, politician
 Sri Sri (writer), writer
 Parasuram (director), writer and director
 Sricharan Pakala, Music director
 Ramana Gogula, Music director
 Satyadev Kancharana, film actor

Municipalities in District

Geography 

Climate

Economy 
The primary, secondary and tertiary sectors of the district contribute ,  and  respectively. The major products contributing to the GVA of the district from agriculture and allied services are, sugarcane, paddy, betel leaves, mango, milk, meat and fisheries. The GVA to the industrial and service sector is contributed from manufacturing, construction, minor minerals, software services and unorganised trade.

Transport 

Education 
The primary and secondary school education is imparted by government, aided and private schools, under the School Education Department of the state. They include 162 government, 2,793 mandal and zilla parishads, 9 residential, 1225 private, 5 model, 34 Kasturba Gandhi Balika Vidyalaya (KGBV), 147 municipal and 829 other types of schools. The total number of students enrolled in primary, upper primary and high schools of the district are 609,587.

Temples 
There are thirty six temples under the management of Endowments Department.

References

External links 

 Official Website
 Vizagport
  This contains a detailed description of the town and district under British rule.

 
Districts of Andhra Pradesh
Uttarandhra
1936 establishments in India